Louis Leon Ludlow (June 24, 1873 – November 28, 1950) was a Democratic Indiana congressman; he proposed a constitutional amendment early in 1938 requiring a national referendum on any U.S. declaration of war except in cases of direct attack. Congress rejected the Ludlow Amendment only by a narrow margin and after an appeal from President Franklin Delano Roosevelt.

Personal life
Ludlow was born on a farm near Connersville, Fayette County, Indiana on June 24, 1873, as one of eight children of Henry Louis and Isabelle (Smiley) Ludlow.  He was married on September 17, 1896, to Katherine Huber of Irvington, Indiana, the society editor on the Sentinel in Washington. After his tenth term in Congress, he resumed work as a newspaper correspondent until his death in Washington, D.C., at George Washington University Hospital, on November 28, 1950, at the age of 77.  He was buried in Rock Creek Cemetery in Washington, DC and was survived by his wife and four children, Margery, Blanche, Virginia, and Louis.

Professional life
He moved to Indianapolis in 1892, where he became a reporter (for the Indianapolis Sun and then the Indianapolis Sentinel and the Indianapolis Press) and later a political writer. Ludlow was a Washington correspondent for Indiana and Ohio newspapers (the Indianapolis Star, the Star League of Indiana, the Columbus Dispatch, and the Ohio State Journal) and a member of the Congressional Press Galleries from 1901 to 1929.  He was elected as a Democrat to the Seventy-first and the nine succeeding Congresses from 1929 to 1949.

References

External links

 

 

  

1873 births
1950 deaths
People from Fayette County, Indiana
The Indianapolis Star people
Democratic Party members of the United States House of Representatives from Indiana